Xavier Coleman (born January 13, 1995) is an American football cornerback who is currently a free agent. He played college football at Portland State.

College career
Coleman was selected to the HM All-Big Sky Conference and was named PSU Team outstanding defensive back in his sophomore season in 2014. He was selected to the second team All-Big Sky Conference in his junior season in 2015.

Professional career

New York Jets
Coleman signed with the New York Jets as an undrafted free agent on May 5, 2017. He was waived by the Jets on September 2, 2017, and was signed to the practice squad the next day. He was promoted to the active roster on October 14, 2017. He was placed on injured reserve on October 25, 2017.

On August 31, 2018, Coleman was waived by the Jets.

Buffalo Bills
On November 7, 2018, Coleman was signed to the Buffalo Bills practice squad.

San Diego Fleet
Coleman was signed by the San Diego Fleet of the Alliance of American Football on February 12, 2019. The league ceased operations in April 2019.

References

External links
Portland State Vikings bio
New York Jets bio

Living people
1995 births
Players of American football from Portland, Oregon
Jesuit High School (Beaverton, Oregon) alumni
American football cornerbacks
Portland State Vikings football players
New York Jets players
Buffalo Bills players
San Diego Fleet players